In Greek mythology, Hippodamia, Hippodamea or Hippodameia (Ancient Greek: Ἱπποδάμεια, "she who masters horses" derived from  hippos "horse" and  damazein "to tame") may refer to these female characters: 
Hippodamia, daughter of Oenomaus, and wife of Pelops.
Hippodamia, wife of Pirithous and daughter of Atrax or Butes.
Hippodamia, wife of Autonous and mother of Anthus.
Hippodamia, daughter of Anicetus who consorted with Zeus.
Hippodamia, name shared by two of the Danaïdes, daughters of King Danaus of Libya either by the hamadryads, Atlanteia or Phoebe. One of them married and killed her husband Istrus and the other Diocorystes. These princes were sons of King Aegyptus of Egypt and an Arabian woman. Either of these two Hippodamia became the mother of Olenus by Zeus.
 Hippodamia, also known as Laodamia or Deidamia, daughter of the hero Bellerophon and Philonoe, daughter of the Lycian king Iobates. She was said to mothered Sarpedon by the god Zeus.
Hippodamia, also known as Alcimede or Cleobule, the mother of Phoenix by Amyntor, and possibly of Asydameia and Crantor.
 Hippodameia, wife of Alcathous (the son of Aesyetes) and daughter of Anchises.
 Hippodamia, possible name for the mother of Guneus by Ocytus.
 Hippodamia, an Athenian maiden who was one of the would-be sacrificial victims of Minotaur.
Hippodameia, a.k.a. Briseis, the wife of a prince in Asia Minor at the time of the Trojan War

Notes

References 

 Apollodorus, The Library with an English Translation by Sir James George Frazer, F.B.A., F.R.S. in 2 Volumes, Cambridge, MA, Harvard University Press; London, William Heinemann Ltd. 1921. ISBN 0-674-99135-4. Online version at the Perseus Digital Library. Greek text available from the same website.
 Diodorus Siculus, The Library of History translated by Charles Henry Oldfather. Twelve volumes. Loeb Classical Library. Cambridge, Massachusetts: Harvard University Press; London: William Heinemann, Ltd. 1989. Vol. 3. Books 4.59–8. Online version at Bill Thayer's Web Site
 Diodorus Siculus, Bibliotheca Historica. Vol 1-2. Immanel Bekker. Ludwig Dindorf. Friedrich Vogel. in aedibus B. G. Teubneri. Leipzig. 1888-1890. Greek text available at the Perseus Digital Library.
 Homer, The Iliad with an English Translation by A.T. Murray, Ph.D. in two volumes. Cambridge, MA., Harvard University Press; London, William Heinemann, Ltd. 1924. . Online version at the Perseus Digital Library.
 Homer, Homeri Opera in five volumes. Oxford, Oxford University Press. 1920. . Greek text available at the Perseus Digital Library.
 Pausanias, Description of Greece with an English Translation by W.H.S. Jones, Litt.D., and H.A. Ormerod, M.A., in 4 Volumes. Cambridge, MA, Harvard University Press; London, William Heinemann Ltd. 1918. . Online version at the Perseus Digital Library
 Pausanias, Graeciae Descriptio. 3 vols. Leipzig, Teubner. 1903.  Greek text available at the Perseus Digital Library.
 Pseudo-Clement, Recognitions from Ante-Nicene Library Volume 8, translated by Smith, Rev. Thomas. T. & T. Clark, Edinburgh. 1867. Online version at theio.com
 Tzetzes, John, Allegories of the Iliad translated by Goldwyn, Adam J. and Kokkini, Dimitra. Dumbarton Oaks Medieval Library, Harvard University Press, 2015. 

Princesses in Greek mythology